Hypatopa crux is a moth in the family Blastobasidae. It is found in Costa Rica.

The length of the forewings is 3.9–5.1 mm. The forewings are pale brown with a few faint markings or pale brown intermixed with brown scales. The hindwings are translucent pale brown, gradually darkening towards the apex.

Etymology
The specific name is derived from Latin crux (meaning a cross).

References

Moths described in 2013
Hypatopa